Paw Paw is a village in Lee County in the U.S. state of Illinois. As of the 2020 census, the village was home to 830 people, down from 870 at the 2010 census. It was settled in the mid 19th century and by 1878 the village had a railroad connection. Paw Paw is home to a house which is listed on the U.S. National Register of Historic Places and was the recipient of a 2005 federal grant to construct a water tower.

History

In 1829, present-day Chicago Road was part of the Frink and Walker stagecoach line from Galena, Illinois to Chicago, though the Potawatomi Indians were the first to use the trail. The tribe didn't turn over the area to the U.S. government until 1833. Frink and Walker also held the mail contract for the area's settlers. The route became popular and garnered a mention in the work of writer Margaret Fuller.

Paw Paw's first permanent resident was David A. Town in 1834, a native of Vermont, Town settled on the south-east side of a  wooded grove. The first cabin was built the next spring by Edward Butterfield on the site of present-day Paw Paw. This first house also held the village's first store and would eventually become the first structure in town to burn. During its earliest days, the town was sectioned off into East, West and South Paw Paw, all of which became known as simply Paw Paw. In 1837, the village got its first postmaster, William Rodgers. Before Rodgers, the nearest post office was 20 miles away in Somonauk. In 1839, a new road was constructed which allowed mail to be carried from Paw Paw to Princeton. The first stagecoach station (known as a "Tavern") was built along Chicago Road and operated by Isaac Balding. Balding operated the station until the railroad came to town several years later.

Though settlement in present-day Paw Paw began during the 1830s, by 1847 there were probably no more than 50 people in the village. The name Paw Paw was derived from a nearby grove of Pawpaw trees on the edge of a  forest. American general Winfield Scott is credited with being the first person of European ancestry to discover the area. The area that Paw Paw is located in was home to more than one stand of Paw Paw trees, thus more than one settlement took the name Paw Paw. To avoid confusion the townspeople renamed the village Wyoming Township. The new name came from the Wyoming Valley in Pennsylvania, where many of Paw Paw's earliest settlers originated. The Wyoming Valley was the scene of a massacre during the American Revolution in which over 300 American settlers were killed by Native Americans allied with the British. Many of Paw Paw's early settlers shared surnames with those who are listed as having been involved in the fighting and massacre.

In 1850, Wyoming Township experienced a growth spurt despite being passed over for the coveted railroad link, by this time there were several businesses and a school. By 1878, the village finally got a railroad connection, was home to two newspapers, three churches and was christened, officially, as Paw Paw. The village was officially established in 1882 and is celebrating its 125th anniversary in 2007.

In 2005, the village received some U.S. federal government attention. On May 22 of that year, a local Queen Anne style house, the Stephen Wright House was listed in the U.S. National Register of Historic Places, it is the only property with that designation in Paw Paw.  The same year the village was the recipient of a US$192,000 United States Environmental Protection Agency earmark to construct an elevated water tower.

Demographics

As of the 2000 United States Census, there were 852 people, 342 households, and 228 families residing in the village. The racial makeup of the village was 98.71% White, 0.12% Native American, 0.35% Asian, and 0.82% from two or more races. Hispanic or Latino of any race were 1.17% of the population.

There were 342 households, out of which 31.3% had children under the age of 18 living with them, 54.1% were married couples living together, 7.9% had a woman householder with no husband present, and 33.3% were non-families. 30.4% of all households were made up of individuals, and 15.5% had someone living alone who was 65 years of age or older. The average household size was 2.49 and the average family size was 3.09.

In the village, the population was spread out, with 27.7% under the age of 18, 6.9% from 18 to 24, 27.1% from 25 to 44, 23.1% from 45 to 64, and 15.1% who were 65 years of age or older. The median age was 38 years. For every 100 women there were 99.5 men. For every 100 women age 18 and over, there were 97.4 men.

The median income for a household in the village was $37,563, and the median income for a family was $47,500. Men had a median income of $36,833 versus $22,000 for women. The per capita income for the village was $17,461. About 2.9% of families and 5.9% of the population were below the poverty line, including 10.7% of those under age 18 and 5.9% of those age 65 or over.

Geography

Paw Paw is located at  (41.687856, -88.982577).

The village is located within close reach of Interstate 39.

Climate
Humid continental climate is a climatic region typified by large seasonal temperature differences, with warm to hot (and often humid) summers and cold (sometimes severely cold) winters.  The Köppen Climate Classification subtype for this climate is "Dfa" (Hot Summer Continental Climate).

Education
Public education in Paw Paw is overseen by Unit 271 school district. The district operates Paw Paw Junior and Senior High School as well as an elementary school, with both schools being located in the village of Paw Paw.

Notable people 

 George Bristow, outfielder for the Cleveland Spiders
 Ulysses S. Guyer, Former U.S. Representative
 Jesse Harper, football coach
 Robben Wright Fleming, educator

Notes

External links
Official village website

Villages in Lee County, Illinois
Villages in Illinois
Populated places established in 1834
1834 establishments in Illinois